Nawin Channgam (Thai นาวิน จันทร์งาม) is a Thai retired footballer.

External links
Profile at Thaipremierleague.co.th

Nawin Channgam
1983 births
Living people
Nawin Channgam
Association football midfielders
Nawin Channgam